The 1874 North Devonshire by-election was fought on 18 March 1874.  The byelection was fought due to the incumbent Conservative MP, Sir Stafford Northcote, becoming Chancellor of the Exchequer.  It was retained by the incumbent.

References

1874 in England
1874 elections in the United Kingdom
By-elections to the Parliament of the United Kingdom in Devon constituencies
Ministerial by-elections to the Parliament of the United Kingdom
19th century in Devon
March 1874 events